Little Big Town is an American country music vocal group from Homewood, Alabama. Founded in 1998, the group has comprised the same four members since its founding: Karen Fairchild, Kimberly Schlapman (née Roads), Phillip Sweet, and Jimi Westbrook. Their musical style relies heavily on four-part vocal harmonies, with all four members alternating as lead vocalists.

After a recording deal with the Mercury Nashville Records label which produced no singles or albums, Little Big Town released its self-titled debut on Monument Records in 2002. It produced two minor country chart singles before the group left the label. In 2005, the group signed to Equity Music Group, an independent record label owned by Clint Black. Their second album, The Road to Here, was released that year, and received a platinum certification from the Recording Industry Association of America (RIAA). A Place to Land, their third album, was released via Equity, then re-released via Capitol Nashville after Equity closed in 2008. Six more albums followed for Capitol: The Reason Why (2010), Tornado (2012),  Pain Killer (2014), The Breaker (2017), Nightfall (2020) and Mr. Sun (2022).

Their albums accounted for 24 singles on Hot Country Songs and Country Airplay, including the No. 1 singles "Pontoon", and "Better Man" along with the top 10 hits "Boondocks", "Bring It On Home", "Little White Church", "Tornado", "Day Drinking", and "Girl Crush".

Early years
Karen Fairchild and Kimberly Schlapman (then Kimberly Bramlett) met at Samford University in 1987, where they both sang in the school's vocal ensembles. In the mid-1990s, Karen Fairchild sang with the Christian vocal group Truth and was featured as a lead singer in a few of their songs. She also formed a duo called KarenLeigh with Leigh Cappillino (a fellow member of the group "Truth" and who later joined the group Point of Grace). KarenLeigh produced the singles, "Save It for a Rainy Day" and "This Love Has". Eventually, Fairchild and Schlapman moved to Nashville, Tennessee, where they reunited and began singing together. Jimi Westbrook joined Schlapman and Fairchild in 1998, followed by Phillip Sweet.

Career

1998–2005: Little Big Town
Little Big Town's first record deal was with Mercury Nashville Records, although the band was dropped from the label's roster without releasing a single or album. In 2001, they sang backing vocals on Collin Raye's album Can't Back Down, while Sweet and Roads co-wrote the song "Back Where I Belong" on Sherrié Austin's 2001 album Followin' a Feelin'.

A second contract, this time with Monument Records Nashville, began in 2002. The band's first album, Little Big Town, was released that year. It produced the singles "Don't Waste My Time" and "Everything Changes", which peaked at 33 and 42 on the Billboard Hot Country Songs chart. Westbrook's father died in 2002, just after the group's first album was released. Fairchild and Sweet both divorced their spouses shortly afterward, and the group exited Monument when the label's Nashville branch was dissolved. The four members all took up day jobs to earn additional money, although they continued to tour as well.

2005-2009: The Road to Here and A Place to Land
In 2005, Little Big Town was signed to Equity Music Group, a label started and partially owned by country music singer Clint Black. Their third single, "Boondocks", was released in May, peaking at No. 9 on the country charts in January 2006. It served as the first of four singles from the group's second album, The Road to Here, which was released on October 4, 2005. "Bring It On Home", the second single from the album, became Little Big Town's first top 5 hit on Hot Country Songs. It was followed by "Good as Gone" and "A Little More You", both of which were top 20 hits. By the end of 2006, The Road to Here had been certified Platinum in the United States. Unlike their first album, the group's members co-wrote the majority of the songs on The Road to Here along with Wayne Kirkpatrick, who also produced it. In 2007, the group sang backing vocals on John Mellencamp's Freedom's Road album.

Little Big Town released A Place to Land, their third studio album and second with Equity, on November 6, 2007. Its lead-off single, "I'm with the Band", peaked at number 32 on the country chart. On April 23, 2008, Little Big Town announced it was leaving Equity for Capitol Nashville. Shortly afterward, they charted with Sugarland and Jake Owen on a live cover of The Dream Academy's "Life in a Northern Town". Taken from Sugarland's 2007 tour, it reached number 28 on the country chart based on unsolicited airplay. In October 2008, Capitol re-released A Place to Land, which added four new songs, and the label promoted two further singles from the album, "Fine Line" and "Good Lord Willing".

In the fall of 2008, Little Big Town opened up for Carrie Underwood on her Carnival Ride Tour. They began their first headlining tour in January 2009 in Jacksonville, Florida and continued through April.

Fairchild recorded a duet with Mellencamp on his 2008 album, Life, Death, Love and Freedom. The song, "A Ride Back Home", was released as the album's third single and was accompanied by a music video. Fairchild also duetted with Mellencamp on "My Sweet Love" and appears in its music video.

Little Big Town was nominated for Vocal Group of the Year for the fourth year in a row at the 2009 CMA Awards.

2010–2013: The Reason Why, commercial success, and Tornado
In March 2010, the group released a new single titled "Little White Church", as the lead-off single to their fourth studio album and first completely new album on Capitol Nashville, The Reason Why, which was released on August 24, 2010. "Little White Church" peaked at number 6 on the country chart. The album produced two additional singles in "Kiss Goodbye" and the title track, but both failed to reach the top 40 of Hot Country Songs.

The album's title track was released as a digital single on July 27, 2010, to begin an iTunes countdown to the album release on August 24, 2010. Three further digital singles – "Kiss Goodbye", "Why, Oh Why", and "All the Way Down" – were released weekly leading up until the album release. Also, in promotion of The Reason Why, Little Big Town went on tour as an opening act for Sugarland on The Incredible Machine Tour, as well their own The Reason Why Tour.

Little Big Town's fifth studio album, Tornado, was released on September 11, 2012. It was also their first album to be produced by Jay Joyce. "Pontoon" was released as the album's lead single on April 30, 2012, and became their first number one hit on Hot Country Songs in September 2012. It was their first single to receive a Platinum certification. The title track was released as the album's second single on October 1, 2012. It reached number 2 on the Country Airplay chart in 2013. At the 55th Grammy Awards, "Pontoon" won the Grammy Award for Best Country Duo/Group Performance. The album was certified gold by the RIAA in December 2012.

The band joined Rascal Flatts on their Changed Tour, along with Eli Young Band and Edens Edge, for dates spanning Summer 2012. They played at the C2C: Country to Country festival in London on March 16, 2013.

The album's third single, "Your Side of the Bed", was a number 27 hit.

The band sang background vocals on Ashley Monroe's 2013 single, "You Got Me", featured on her 2013 release, Like a Rose. Group member Karen Fairchild co-wrote the song with Monroe. It failed to chart.

The album's fourth single, "Sober", was a number 31 hit.

2014–2016: Pain Killer and Grand Ole Opry invitation
Little Big Town performed harmony vocals on David Nail's 2014 album, I'm a Fire, on the song "When They're Gone (Lyle County)", co-written by Brett Eldredge. They were also featured on Miranda Lambert's 2014 album, Platinum, on "Smokin' and Drinkin'", a song which the band was going to record themselves; it debuted on Billboard'''s Country Airplay chart at number 38 after their performance at the CMA Awards in 2014 and was released as a single in 2015.

The band began recording their sixth studio album, Pain Killer, in early 2014. The lead single, "Day Drinking", was released digitally June 3, and was sent to country radio on June 9. It debuted on the Country Airplay chart at number 32, their highest-ever debut at the time, and went on to peak at number 2 on Country Airplay. It hit number 1 on the Canada Country chart, becoming their second number 1 single and first as songwriters. Pain Killer's track listing was announced on July 14, and the album was released on October 21.

On October 3, 2014, Reba McEntire invited the group to join the Grand Ole Opry. They accepted and were inducted by Vince Gill on October 17.

The second single from the album, "Girl Crush", was released December 15, 2014. Some radio stations were reported to have pulled "Girl Crush" from their playlists, in response to concerns from listeners who interpreted the song's lyrics to be about lesbianism. In response, Fairchild said, "That's just shocking to me, the close-mindedness of that, when that's just not what the song was about…But what if it were? It's just a greater issue of listening to a song for what it is." In addition, the label created a short commercial in which the band discusses the song and its actual meaning. Billboard consulted several radio program directors on its panel and found only one who detailed a specific complaint from a listener. The song became their second No. 1 on a Billboard chart in May 2015 and their highest showing on the Billboard Hot 100 after gaining exposure on "The Voice" and the 50th Annual ACM Awards. The album's third single and the title track, "Pain Killer", released to country radio on August 24, 2015.

On September 9, 2015, the group was nominated for five CMA Awards: Vocal Group of the Year, Album of the Year for Pain Killer, Single of the Year for "Girl Crush", Music Video of the Year for "Girl Crush" and Musical Event of the Year for their collaboration on the Miranda Lambert single "Smokin' and Drinkin'". They tied Eric Church for most nominations that year. Additionally, the songwriters of "Girl Crush" were recognized with a Song of the Year win.

For the 58th Annual Grammy Awards Pain Killer was nominated for Best Country Album, "Girl Crush" was nominated for Best Country Duo/Group Performance, Song of the Year and Best Country Song. Little Big Town only received nominations for Best Country Album and Best Country Duo/Group Performance since they did not write on "Girl Crush".

On January 24, 2016, the band sang the National Anthem before the Arizona/Carolina NFC Championship game. On July 4 of that year, they performed with the Boston Pops at their annual Independence Day concert.

2016–2017: Wanderlust, The Breaker, and Ryman residency
In February 2016, they appeared on "Take Me Down", a track on Down to My Last Bad Habit, the fourteenth album by Vince Gill.

In March 2016, Little Big Town returned to the UK as part of the C2C: Country to Country tour, becoming one of four acts at the time (the others being Brantley Gilbert, Sam Hunt and Carrie Underwood) to perform at the festival twice. They headlined the launch party in 2015 where they announced the full line-up, revealing they would be supporting Underwood along with Hunt and Maddie & Tae.

On May 24, 2016, the band announced their seventh studio album titled Wanderlust. The album contains eight tracks produced by Pharrell Williams and was released on June 10, 2016. Fairchild describes the album as, "It's not a country album and it's not like anything we've ever done. It's fun to be spontaneous and put it out there to the fans, because we want to, and not to overthink it, but just because it has brought us a lot of joy, and we think it will for them as well. So why not? We're going with our gut and putting it out there. It's just music, you know?"
Fairchild stated that they are also working on a country record with Jay Joyce. In July, they appeared on the 2000–2005 episode of ABC's Greatest Hits where they performed covers by Alicia Keys, Oasis and Sheryl Crow. They were also selected as one of 30 artists to perform on "Forever Country", a mash-up track of "Take Me Home, Country Roads", "On the Road Again" and "I Will Always Love You", which celebrates 50 years of the CMA Awards.

The band released "Better Man", which was written by singer-songwriter Taylor Swift, on October 20, 2016, as the lead single to their upcoming seventh studio album, The Breaker, that was released on February 24, 2017. Initially masking the song's writer, the band revealed that Swift wrote the song. The song's music video, directed by Reid Long and Becky Fluke, was released November 1, 2016. The band would follow up with singles "Happy People", their worst-charting single to date, and "When Someone Stops Loving You", a minor top 40 hit.

The band announced they would be the first act in history to have a residency at the Ryman Auditorium in Nashville. Little Big Town announced a six-date UK tour supported by Seth Ennis beginning on September 28 and concluding in London on October 5 before revealing that Kacey Musgraves and Midland would support them on the American leg of The Breakers Tour beginning in February 2018. On October 5 during their show at the Royal Albert Hall, the band revealed that they would be headlining the 2018 C2C: Country to Country festival, making history as the first act to play the event three times.

2018–present: Nightfall and Mr. Sun
"Summer Fever" was released as a stand-alone single on June 6, 2018. It debuted (and peaked) at number 29 on Country Airplay, becoming the band's highest debut to date. The song also peaked within the top 40 of Hot Country Songs and Canada Country charts.

The group then released "The Daughters" on April 5, 2019 as the first single from their ninth album Nightfall, which the band produced themselves. It was released on January 17, 2020. "The Daughters" debuted at number 29 on Hot Country Songs but was not promoted to radio and thus failed to chart on Country Airplay. On September 8, 2019, Little Big Town released "Over Drinking", the second single from Nightfall. The band embarked on a 30-date theatre tour of the same name with supporting act Caitlyn Smith, beginning with a show at New York City's Carnegie Hall the day before the album release.

On April 11, 2022, the band released the song "Hell Yeah". On July 19, the band announced their tenth studio album, Mr. Sun, which was released on September 16.

DiscographyLittle Big Town (2002)The Road to Here (2005)A Place to Land (2007)The Reason Why (2010)Tornado (2012)Pain Killer (2014)Wanderlust (2016)The Breaker (2017)Nightfall (2020)Mr. Sun'' (2022)

Tours

Headlining
The Reason Why Tour (2011)
Tornado Tour (2013)
Pain Killer Tour (2014–2015)
The Breakers Tour (2017–2018)
The Nightfall Tour (2020)

Co-headlining
The Bandwagon Tour with Miranda Lambert (2018, 2022)

Supporting
Still Alive in 06 with Keith Urban (2006)
CMT on Tour: Change for Change Tour with Sugarland and Jake Owen (2007)
George Strait 2008 Arena Tour with George Strait (2008)
The Waking Up Laughing Tour with Martina McBride (2007–08) 
Carnival Ride Tour with Carrie Underwood (2008) 
A Place to Land Tour with Zac Brown Band and Ashton Shepherd
The Incredible Machine Tour 2010 with Sugarland and Randy Montana (2010) 
The Incredible Machine Tour 2011 with Sugarland, Matt Nathanson and Casey James (2011) 
Revolution Continues Tour with Miranda Lambert (2011) 
Changed Tour with Rascal Flatts, Eli Young Band and Edens Edge (2012)
Light the Fuse Tour with Keith Urban and Dustin Lynch (2013)
C2C: Country to Country with Tim McGraw (2013) and Carrie Underwood (2016)
Kill the Lights Tour with Luke Bryan and Dustin Lynch (2015–16)
50th Anniversary Tour with Eagles (2022)

Personal lives

Kimberly Roads married Stephen Schlapman on November 28, 2006, and gave birth to a daughter in July 2007. In January 2017, Schlapman announced that she and her husband adopted another daughter on December 31, 2016. She now goes by her husband's last name, Schlapman. Kimberly was previously married to Steven Roads, who died from a heart attack in 2005. He was also the band's lawyer.

Phillip Sweet married Rebecca Arthur on March 30, 2007. They welcomed a daughter in December 2007.

Karen Fairchild and Jimi Westbrook were married privately on May 31, 2006. They have a son born in 2010.

Musical stylings
Little Big Town's musical stylings are defined by four-part vocal harmonies. Unlike most vocal groups, Little Big Town does not feature a definitive lead vocalist. Instead, their songs are either led by any one of the four members, or by all four in varying combinations (such as on "Boondocks" and "Life in a Northern Town").

Awards and nominations

Academy of Country Music Awards (ACM)

American Country Awards (ACA)

American Country Countdown Awards (ACC)

American Music Awards (AMA)

Billboard Music Awards

British Country Music Association Awards

Country Music Association Awards (CMA)

CMT Artists of the Year

CMT Music Awards

A. with Sugarland and Jake Owen 
B. with Andra Day, Common, Lee Ann Womack and Danielle Bradbery 
C. with Jason Aldean, Keith Urban and Chris Stapleton 
D. with Gladys Knight

Daytime Emmy Awards

Grammy Awards

People's Choice Awards

Teen Choice Awards

Television appearances

References

External links
 

Country music groups from Alabama
Capitol Records artists
Musical groups established in 1998
Vocal quartets
Mercury Records artists
Equity Music Group artists
Monument Records artists
Daytime Emmy Award winners
Grammy Award winners
Country musicians from Alabama
People from Homewood, Alabama
People from Toccoa, Georgia
1998 establishments in Alabama
Grand Ole Opry members